Cayambe Coca National Park is a national park in Ecuador located along the Equator about  from Quito.

The reserve
The park includes two very different regions of Ecuador, the high altitude sierra with Cayambe volcano and the hot, humid rainforest of the Amazon basin as well as the intervening temperate cloud forest. There are three entrances, and the one chosen by the visitor will reflect which region they wish to visit because there are few tracks within the park. The entrance near the town of Cayambe in Pichincha Province provides access to the mountain. The high level "Ruales-Oleas-Bergé Refuge" is a mountain hut with accommodation for those who wish to climb the volcano, while other attractions include lakes, waterfalls and forests. An entrance near Papallacta in Napo Province provides access to the forests and lakelets in the Andean foothills and the Páramo, an area of tropical, montane vegetation above the treeline. A third entrance near Santa Rosa de Quijos provided access to the formerly spectacular San Rafael Falls, once the highest waterfall in the country.

Fauna 
Large birds such as the Andean condor and variable hawk are commonplace in the skies above the reserve. Spectacled bears, foxes, and deer are some of the larger animals of the reserve. Páramo rabbits and armadillos are among the smaller fauna. There are 106 species of mammals, including the mountain tapir, cougar and culpeo, 395 species of birds, 70 reptiles, and 116 amphibians.

Flora 

Local habitat types include the grasslands of the páramo and montane cloud forests.  Bunchgrasses, ferns, and lycopods are common plants. There are over 100 species of endemic plants.

Culture 
There are indigenous communities living within the protected area such as the Quechua people of Oyacachi in the Napo Province and the Cofán people of Sinangoé in the Sucumbíos Province.

Tourist attractions 

Papallacta, which features hot springs and highland prairies frequented for fishing and bird watching.
Cayambe Canton, which is the site of the Pambamarca pre-Incan structures, the Sun and Moon temples in Puntiatsil, and part of the Inca Trail.
 The snow-topped Cayambe volcano.
 Lake Puruhanta, which has trails, and camping, and is the site of ancient ruins called la Mesa.
 Lago San Marcos
On February 2, 2020 the water stopped flowing, the result of a sinkhole nearby which divided the cascade into three streams which are no longer easily observed.  
 Quijos Valley
The summits Sarahurco and Cerro Puntas and the Reventador Volcano (3485 m)
The virgin forests of Paquiestancia and Cascade of Buga (3500 m)

See also 
 List of national parks in Ecuador

References

External links 
 Explore the Diverse Terrain of the Cayambe Coca Ecological Reserve
 Photos of Cayambe-Coca Ecological Reserve

Nature reserves in Ecuador
Geography of Sucumbíos Province
Geography of Napo Province
Geography of Pichincha Province
Geography of Imbabura Province
Tourist attractions in Sucumbíos Province
Tourist attractions in Napo Province
Tourist attractions in Pichincha Province
Tourist attractions in Imbabura Province
Protected areas established in 1970
1970 establishments in Ecuador
Northwestern Andean montane forests